|}

The Amethyst Stakes is a Group 3 flat horse race in Ireland open to thoroughbreds aged three years or older. It is run over a distance of 1 mile (1,609 metres) at Leopardstown in May.

History
The event was formerly staged at Phoenix Park. For a period it held Listed status. Known previously by sponsored titles, it was renamed the Amethyst Stakes in 1989. It was transferred to Leopardstown in 1991.

The Amethyst Stakes was promoted to Group 3 level in 2007.

Records
Most successful horse since 1986 (3 wins):
 Burden of Proof – 1997, 1998, 1999
 Famous Name – 2010, 2011, 2012

Leading jockey since 1986 (6 wins):
 Johnny Murtagh – Thornberry (1991), Akhiyar (1995), Burden of Proof (1997, 1998), Anzari (2000), Arch Rebel (2006)
 Michael Kinane – Brief Truce (1992), Unusual Heat (1993), City Nights (1994), Burden of Proof (1999), D'Anjou (2004), Danak (2007)

Leading trainer since 1986 (8 wins):
 Dermot Weld – Brief Truce (1992), Unusual Heat (1993), City Nights (1994), Famous Name (2010, 2011, 2012), Mustajeeb (2014), Hazapour (2019)

Winners since 1986

See also
 Horse racing in Ireland
 List of Irish flat horse races

References
 Racing Post:

 galopp-sieger.de – Amethyst Stakes.
 ifhaonline.org – International Federation of Horseracing Authorities – Amethyst Stakes (2019).
 pedigreequery.com – Amethyst Stakes – Leopardstown.

Open mile category horse races
Leopardstown Racecourse
Flat races in Ireland